The Adidas Boost Boston Games (stylized as adidas BOOST Boston Games) is an annual track and field meeting and street meet in Boston, Massachusetts. The event was announced on the same day the Adidas Grand Prix meet in New York was removed from the Diamond League schedule in 2016. The traditional track events are held in the Henry G. Steinbrenner Stadium on the campus of the Massachusetts Institute of Technology, while the street meet portion is held on an elevated straight track constructed between Boston Common and the Boston Public Garden.

The event has hosted several Olympic track and field athletes, including 400 m world record holder and Rio gold medalist Wayde van Niekerk in 2017.

Event records

Men

Track portion

Street portion

Women

Track portion

Street portion

Notes

References

External links
Official website

2016 establishments in Massachusetts
Annual track and field meetings
Recurring sporting events established in 2016
Sports competitions in Boston
Sports in Cambridge, Massachusetts
Track and field in Massachusetts